William Smith (died 1673) was Archdeacon of Armagh from 1669 until his death in 1673.

Smith was born at Cowling, Craven, educated at St John's College, Cambridge  and ordained on 30 October 1661. He held livings at Tydavnet, Kilmore and Drumsnat. He was buried at Church of St. Nicholas Within, Dublin on 11 February 1673.

Notes

17th-century Irish Anglican priests
Archdeacons of Armagh
Clergy from Yorkshire
17th-century English people
Alumni of St John's College, Cambridge
People from Craven District
1673 deaths
Year of birth unknown